The centre-left coalition is an alliance of political parties in Italy active, under several forms and names, since 1995 when The Olive Tree was formed under the leadership of Romano Prodi. The centre-left coalition has ruled the country for more than 15 years between 1996 and 2022. 

In the 1996 general election The Olive Tree consisted of the majority of both the left-wing Alliance of Progressives and the centrist Pact for Italy, the two losing coalitions in the 1994 general election, the first under a system based primarily on first-past-the-post voting. In 2005 The Union was founded as a wider coalition to contest the 2006 general election, which later collapsed during the 2008 political crisis, with the fall of the Prodi II Cabinet.

In recent history, the centre-left coalition has been built around the Democratic Party (PD), which was established in 2007 from a merger of Democrats of the Left and Democracy is Freedom, the main parties affiliated to both The Olive Tree and The Union. The centre-left coalition was part of Italian governments from November 2011 to June 2018, when a coalition government between the Five Star Movement (M5S) and the League was formed. However, in September 2019, the centre-left returned to power in coalition with the M5S, with centre-left parties participating in the national unity government of Mario Draghi as of February 2021 until its collapse in July 2022.

History

Road to The Olive Tree

Following the 1994 general election, which was won by the centre-right coalition of Silvio Berlusconi, the left-wing Alliance of Progressives and the centrist Pact for Italy started a parliamentary cooperation, which brought in March 1995 to the foundation of The Olive Tree. The historical leader and ideologue of these coalitions was Romano Prodi, Professor of Economics and former leftist Christian Democrat, who invented the name and the symbol of The Olive Tree with Arturo Parisi in 1995.

In 1995 the Lega Nord exited the centre-right Pole of Freedoms and supported Lamberto Dini's technocratic government, together with the Pact for Italy and the Alliance of Progressives.

On 21 April 1996, The Olive Tree won 1996 general election with the Communist Refoundation Party (PRC) as an external ally, making Romano Prodi the Prime Minister of Italy. The Olive Tree's largest partner was the Democratic Party of the Left (PDS), which contained the bulk of the former Italian Communist Party. The PDS supplied 16 ministers and 10 junior ministers–the first time that (former) Communists had taken part in government since 1947. One of their leaders, Walter Veltroni, who ran in ticket with Prodi in a long electoral campaign, was Deputy Prime Minister. On 9 October 1998, the Prodi I Cabinet fell when PRC left the alliance. Since 21 October 1998 The Olive Tree was the core of the governments led by Massimo D'Alema and by Giuliano Amato. When D'Alema became Prime Minister, it was the first time ever in both Italy and Western Europe that an heir of the communist tradition came to lead a government. On 13 May 2001, led by Francesco Rutelli, who ran in ticket with Piero Fassino, the coalition lost the general elections against Silvio Berlusconi and his House of Freedoms centre-right coalition.

The Union

The Union was the direct heir of The Olive Tree. However, The Union was an heterogenous alliance that also included parties of the radical left, which were not part of The Olive Tree. Romano Prodi won the April 2006 general election by a very narrow margin due to the new electoral law enacted by Roberto Calderoli, although Silvio Berlusconi first refused to acknowledge defeat. Prodi's coalition proved to be extremely frail, as the two-vote margin in the Senate allowed almost any party in the coalition to veto legislation and political views inside the coalition spanned from far-left Communist parties to Christian Democrats.

The centre-left majority coalition, on 7 May 2006, officially endorsed Giorgio Napolitano as its candidate in the presidential election that began on 8 May. The Vatican endorsed him as President through its official newspaper, L'Osservatore Romano, just after The Union named him as its candidate, as did Marco Follini, former secretary of the Union of Christian and Centre Democrats, a member party of the House of Freedoms. Napolitano was elected on 10 May, in the fourth round of voting — the first of those requiring only an absolute majority, unlike the first three which required two-thirds of the votes — with 543 votes (out of a possible 1009).  At the age of 80, he became the first former Communist to become President of Italy

Less than a year after he had won the elections, on 21 February 2007, Prodi tendered his resignation to President Napolitano after the government was defeated in the Senate by 2 ballots in a vote on foreign policy.  On 24 February, President Napolitano invited Prodi to return to office and face a vote of confidence. Major causes of friction inside the coalition were, the 2006 pardon Act (criticised by the right and by the Italy of Values party), a draft bill to establish civil unions (vetoed by Christian Democrats), Italy's continued involvement in Afghanistan (strongly opposed by left-wing parties), and finally the much publicised house-arrest of Clemente Mastella's wife (then a prominent politician at the regional level) over a corruption scandal. Mastella's party,  UDEUR, held just enough seats in the Senate that his eventual decision to withdraw its support for the government meant the end of the legislature on 6 February 2008. Mastella, who also resigned from his office as Minister of Justice, cited the lack of personal support from his coalition partners' as one of the reasons behind his decision, together with a proposed reform of the electoral system which would have made it difficult for small parties like his own to gain seats in the Italian Parliament.

The foundation of the Democratic Party

The Democratic Party was founded on 14 October 2007 as a merger of various centre-left parties which had been part of The Union in the 2006 general election. At foundation the majority of the PD was formed by the Democrats of the Left (heirs of the Italian Communist Party) and the largely Catholic-inspired Democracy is Freedom – The Daisy. Within the party, an important role is thus played by Christian leftists, who are direct heirs of the former Christian Democracy's left.

After the resignation of Silvio Berlusconi as Prime Minister in November 2011, the PD gave external support to Mario Monti's technocratic government.

Following the 2013 general election and the 2014 European Parliament election, the PD was the largest party in the Chamber of Deputies, the Senate and the European Parliament, respectively. Since April 2013 Enrico Letta, a Democrat, was Prime Minister, at the head of a government sustained by a grand coalition including The People of Freedom (later replaced by the New Centre-Right), Civic Choice and the Union of the Centre (later replaced by the Populars for Italy). Following his election as party leader, in February 2014 Matteo Renzi called for "a new phase" and, consequently, the party's national board voted to ask Letta to resign. Subsequently, Renzi was sworn in as Prime Minister at the head of the same coalition. As of 2015, other than the national government, Democrats head fifteen regional governments out of twenty and function as coalition partner in Trentino-Alto Adige/Südtirol.

The 2016 constitutional referendum was supported by the majority of the centre-left coalition. Inside the centre-left coalition only UdC, FdV, ALPE, UVP, SSk and UPC campaigned for the "No" vote. The referendum was lost with 41% of "Yes" against 59% of "No" votes. After the referendum, Renzi tendered his resignation as Prime Minister and Paolo Gentiloni became his successor.

In the 2018 general election the centre-left, with Renzi as leader, obtained its worst result ever: 22.9% of the vote, well behind the centre-right coalition and the M5S. Following the defeat, Renzi resigned from secretary of the PD, and his deputy Maurizio Martina functioning afterwards as acting secretary.

In 2019, the PD formed a coalition with the Five Star Movement (M5S) and Free and Equal (LeU), which was supported by the members of the centre-left coalition in 2018. Following the 2021 Italian government crisis, the government was replaced by the Draghi Cabinet in February 2021, a national unity government including the PD, MS5, PD splinters Article One and Italia Viva, and centre-right coalition parties the League and Forza Italia. The Draghi government collapsed during the 2022 Italian government crisis on 14–21 July 2022, leading to Draghi's resignation as prime minister and a snap election being called.

For the 2022 general election, the coalition centres around the PD’s Democratic and Progressive Italy list, allied with the Civic Commitment, Greens and Left Alliance and More Europe electoral lists.

The Olive Tree (1995–2005)

1996–1998 
In the 1996 general election and during the Prodi I Cabinet the coalition was composed of the following parties:

The coalition had the following regional partners:

The Olive Tree presented candidates of The Network and the Ladin Autonomist Union in some first-past-the-post constituencies. The coalition also made an agreement of desistance with the Communist Refoundation Party in some first-past-the-post constituencies, which ran under the banner of the Progressives.

1998–2001 
In 1998 the Communist Refoundation Party brought down the Prodi II Cabinet. with a splinter faction forming the Party of Italian Communists. In 1998–2001, during the two governments led by Massimo D'Alema (I Cabinet and II Cabinet, 1998–2000) and the one led by Giuliano Amato (Amato II Cabinet, 2000–2001), the coalition was composed of eight parties:

2001 general election 
In the 2001 general election the coalition, led by Francesco Rutelli, was composed of nine parties:

The coalition also had the following regional partners:

The Olive Tree also made an agreement of desistance with the Communist Refoundation Party in the first-past-the-post constituencies.

2004 EP election 
In the 2004 European Parliament election, the United in the Olive Tree joint list, was composed of four parties:

The list was connected with the following regional partners:

The Union (2005–2008)

2006 general election 
In the 2006 general election the coalition was composed of thirteen parties:

The coalition had the following regional partners:

The coalition was supported by the Autonomists for Europe, Radicals of the Left and the New Action Party.

PD-led coalitions (2008–present)

2008 general election 
In the 2008 general election the coalition, led by Walter Veltroni, was composed of three parties:

The coalition also had the following regional partners:

2013 general election 

In the 2013 general election, the coalition ran as Italy. Common Good under the leadership of Pier Luigi Bersani, and was composed of the following parties:

The coalition had the following regional partners:

2018 general election 
In the 2018 general election the coalition was composed of four electoral lists:

The coalition also had the following regional partners:

The centre-left coalition was also supported by the Ladin Autonomist Union and the Slovene Union.

2022 general election 
For the 2022 general election the alliance was formed by four parties:

The coalition contested the election in some regions under the following banners:

There were regional agreements between the centre-left coalition and Action – Italia Viva in Trentino for the Senate election and in Aosta Valley for both Chamber and Senate elections. The Italian Left ran instead with the Five Star Movement and Democratic Area in Aosta Valley.

Popular support

Electoral results

Italian Parliament

Regional Councils

See also 
 Centre-right coalition (Italy)
 Alliance of Progressives
 Pact for Italy
 The Olive Tree
 The Union
 Italy. Common Good

References

Political party alliances in Italy